Aadi Lakshmi  is a 2006 Indian Telugu language romantic thriller film directed by R. V. Suresh and starring Srikanth, Vadde Naveen and Sridevi. The film was released on 8 December 2006.

Cast 

 Srikanth  as Aadi / Shankar
 Vadde Naveen as Lakshmi Prasad
 Sridevi as Surekha
 Poornima as Poornima
 Babloo Prithiveeraj
 Sudha as Lakshmi Prasad
 Nutan Prasad as Judge
 Mallikarjuna Rao as Malli
 Naramalli Sivaprasad
 Sivaji Raja as police inspector
 Ali
 Uttej as police constable
 Abhinayasri as police inspector
 Jenny as doctor
 Vijaya Ranga Raju as doctor
 Raghunatha Reddy
 Kadambari Kiran
 Sana
 Raghu Babu
 Chittajalu Lakshmipati
 Chakri (Cameo appearance)

Production 
The film is directed by R. V. Suresh, who previously directed Sivayya and Manasichi Choodu with Vadde Naveen under the name of Suresh Varma. The film includes portions shot at the hospital set in Nanakramguda Cine Village, Hyderabad; and the climax was shot at the Stock Market in Somajiguda, Hyderabad. The film wrapped up shooting in November 2006.

Soundtrack 
The music is composed by Chakri.
"Love U Lolly Pop" - Chakri, Kousalya
"Naa Cell Phone" - Kousalya, Ravi Verma
"Intakalamu" - Venu, Sudha
"Dole Dole" - Ranjith, Suchitra
"Rojuko Muddu" - Shreya Ghoshal
"Jil Jil Prema" - Vedala Hemachandra, Kousalya

Reception 
A critic from Full Hyderabad wrote that "With some better performances, direction and camerawork, Adilakshmi might have been a better movie. It actually was a better movie – in the form of Deewangee, whose copy it is" and called Srikanth "the only saving grace. B. Anuradha from Webindia123 opined that "His [R. V. Suresh's] disjointed and repetitive screenplay dilutes the interesting point, over which he perhaps wanted to provoke a discussion" but praised Srikanth's performance. Kishore from Nowrunning opined that "The plot is good. But possessiveness of Srikanth could have been shown more vividly. There are a few loose ends like Vadde Naveen getting away from an accident scratch free.  climax could have been made more interesting". A critic from Indiaglitz praised Chakri's music, Srikanth's performance and the story.

References

External links 
 

2006 films
2000s Telugu-language films